BMD Group is an Australian construction company based in Brisbane, Queensland. In 2016 it was listed at 44 in The Australian Financial Review's "Top 500 Private Companies", with an estimated annual revenue of 895 million.

The group was founded by Mick Power in 1979.

Group companies
The group includes:
 BMD Constructions
 BMD Urban
 BMD Industrial
 Empower
 JMAC Constructions (acquired 2005)
 Urbex

Projects
BMD Constructions builds roads and bridges for state government agencies and other large infrastructure facilities. Examples include:
 the bridge to carry Melton Highway over the Bendigo railway line in Melbourne for the Level Crossing Removal Authority
upgrade of the Ipswich Motorway in Brisbane
improve flood immunity of the Bruce Highway
expansion of the Dalrymple Bay Coal Terminal at Hay Point, Mackay 
expansion of the Port Botany Container Terminal for Patrick Stevedores
Adani Carmichael Rail Network, Central Queensland

References

Companies based in Brisbane
Privately held companies of Australia
Construction and civil engineering companies of Australia
Australian companies established in 1979
Construction and civil engineering companies established in 1979
[